Penza is the largest city and administrative center of Penza Oblast, Russia. As of the 2010 Census, Penza had a population of 517,311, making it the 38th-largest city in Russia.

Etymology 

Geography

Urban layout

This central quarter occupies the territory on which the wooden fortress Penza was once located, therefore it is sometimes called the Serf. The architectural concept of the old fortress, erected on the eastern slope of the mountain above the river, predetermined the direction of the first streets. The direction and location of the first streets were set by the passage towers of the fortress and the orientation of its walls. This is how the first six streets of the city were formed. Subsequently, the names were fixed to them: Governor's, Lekarskaya, Moscow, Nikolskaya, Sadovaya and Teatralnaya.

An important element of the urban development of the city is that the square of the fortress created a network of streets converging at right angles. Initially, there was no proper harmony in them. Often the difficult terrain of the area forced the direction and width of the road to change. Here and there, spontaneous development took shape. Nevertheless, the urban planning matrix was created and predetermined the development of the city for several centuries. During the reign of Empress Catherine the Great, the first general plan of Penza was drawn up, it was approved on October 6, 1785. The city was rebuilt anew in accordance with the rectilinear structure of St. Petersburg. The plan of the city, in its central part practically did not change, as it fully complied with the new norms of Russian urban planning. The mutually perpendicular orientation of the streets and the accompanying division of the urban environment into standard quarters was the original and distinctive feature of Penza. Perhaps Penza owes this to its first builders, who are well acquainted with the European urban planning trends of the 17th century - the German Joseph von Sommer (Lieutenant Colonel of the Moscow Service Osip Zumerovsky) and the Polish nobleman Yuri Kotransky. At the end of the next 18th century, in the process of implementing Catherine's master plan for Penza, only some sections of the old streets were straightened, the standard width of the roadway and sidewalks was set. The redevelopment of the city was preceded by the resettlement of the serving suburban population from the center to suburban villages and wastelands. Newly carved quarters of the Upland part of the city, more comfortable for living, were inhabited by the nobility and eminent merchants.
Initially, the fortress was not only a defense complex, but also the administrative center of a vast region. On that place the governor, archives, treasury, prison, arsenal and other instruments of the regional statehood were settled. In the fortress there was the main cathedral of the region – Spassky and the main square of the city – Cathedral. In accordance with the General Plan of 1785, the dilapidated fortress, trading rows and philistine buildings adjacent to its walls were dismantled. As a result of clearing, the posadskaya Nikolskaya church came out of the environment of spontaneous buildings and acquired a harmonious look, becoming a true decoration of the city.

For several years, on the territory of the central quarter and adjacent streets, state-owned stone buildings were complexly erected: the bishop's courtyard, the governor's residence, the assembly of the nobility and two buildings of public places (7.1 and 7.4).) By the beginning of the 20th century, private residential There are no buildings left in the Fortress Quarter of the city. In the Fortress Quarter there is also a special administrative street of the city – the Line of Public Places, passing from Sadovaya to Moskovskaya, bypassing the Spassky Cathedral. It has never had and still does not have residential buildings. the eastern earthen rampart of the old Penza fortress The ancient defensive rampart runs along the western side of Kirov Street (on this section, Kirov Street was formerly called Teatralnaya Street).

The Cathedral was destroyed by the Communists in 1934, and rebuilt between 2010 and 2022.

History

Penza was founded as a Russian frontier fortress-city, and to this day, remnants of the Lomovskaya sentry line built in 1640 have been preserved at the western edge of the city, and remains of earth ramparts dating from the mid-16th century are preserved in the city center. Until 1663, Penza was a wooden stockade with only a small settlement. In May 1663, the architect Yuri Kontransky arrived in Penza on the Tsar's orders to direct the construction of a fortress city, as part of a wider fortress building program to protect Russia from attacks by Crimean Tatars.   The initial construction consisted of a wooden Kremlin, a village, and quarters for the nobility, small tradesmen, and merchants. The Muscovite government placed the Cossacks here, who constructed a fortress and called it "Cherkassy Ostroh", from which the regional city of Penza has developed, thanks to the arrival of new settlers, particularly Russians. The Cossack roots of the city and its first settlers are now remembered in the names of Cherkasskaya street, along with the "Cherkassy" historical district.

In 1774, the insurgent army led by Yemelyan Pugachev occupied Penza after the citizens of the city welcomed the rebellious Cossacks. The first stone houses started to appear after 1801, and by 1809 Penza's population had grown to more than 13,000 people.

In 1918, Vladimir Lenin sent a telegram to communists in the Penza area, complaining about the "insurrection of five kulak districts". He urged the public hanging of 100 "landlords, richmen, bloodsuckers", grain seizure, and hostage-liberation. This telegram has been used in several historical works on the period and on Lenin. During the Russian Civil War, the Czechoslovak Legions launched an anti-Bolshevik uprising in Penza.

During the Soviet period, the city developed as a regional industrial center. The Ural mainframe was made here between 1959 and 1964.

Administrative and municipal status
Penza is the administrative center of the oblast. Within the framework of administrative divisions, it is incorporated as the city of oblast significance of Penza—an administrative unit with a status equal to that of the districts. As a municipal division, the city of oblast significance of Penza is incorporated as Penza Urban Okrug.

Transportation
Penza is a major railway junction and lies on the M5 highway linking Moscow and Chelyabinsk. Penza Airport serves domestic flights. Local public transport includes buses, trolleybuses and marshrutkas (routed taxis).

Education and culture

Currently, the city of Penza is seen as a regional center for higher education. It has six universities (the Penza State University, the Pedagogic University, the Academy of Agriculture, the Technology Institute, the University of Architecture and Construction, and the Artillery and Engineering Institute), 13 colleges and 77 public schools. Penza's largest repertoire theatre  is Penza Oblast Drama Theater named after A. V. Lunacharsky.  Another prominent and unique theater is the Theater of Doctor Dapertutto, founded by Natalia Kugel and located in the former home of Russian theater director Vsevolod Meyerhold. Besides this, Penza is home to four museums, and three art galleries including The Museum of One Painting named after G. V. Myasnikov.

Facilities of higher education include:
Penza State University
Penza State Pedagogical University (unified with Penza State University in 2012)
Penza State University of Architecture and Construction
Penza Artillery Engineering Institute
Penza State Technological Academy
Penza State Agricultural University
Penza branch of the Moscow's Institute of Economics, Management and Law
Penza branch of the Russian State University of Innovative Technologies and Entrepreneurship

Climate
Penza has a humid continental climate (Köppen climate classification Dfb) with long, cold winters and warm summers. Some of the higher fluctuations in temperatures were recorded with seven straight days of temperatures  and higher compared to the previous year where the higher temperatures for the same period were, on average,  lower.

Sports
Penza first hosted the Russian Sidecarcross Grand Prix in 2009, and did so again in 2010, on August 15.

Dizel Penza is Penza's professional hockey team, playing in the VHL.  Dizelist Penza is a junior club playing in the NMHL.

The city football team FC Zenit Penza was established in 1918 but now plays in the Russian Amateur League. Penza has also a professional rugby union club, Imperia-Dynamo Penza, from Russia's Professional Rugby League.

Honors
A minor planet, 3189 Penza, discovered by Soviet astronomer Nikolai Chernykh in 1978, is named after the city.

People

Twin towns – sister cities

Penza is twinned with:
 Békéscsaba, Hungary (1970)
 Busan, South Korea (2007)
 Lanzhou, China
 Ramat Gan, Israel (2007)
 Mogilev, Belarus (2008)

See also
Center of Theatrical Arts «House of Meyerhold»
Penza Planetarium
List of largest cuckoo clocks
Messi (cougar)

Sources

References

Notes

Sources

External links
Official website of Penza  
"PenzaNews" news agency

 
Populated places established in 1663
1663 establishments in Russia
Penzensky Uyezd